The Ell House (now The Ell Shop) is an historic building in Dunkeld, Perth and Kinross, Scotland. Standing at the corner of High Street and Cathedral Street, near Dunkeld Market Cross, it is a Category B listed building dating to 1757. It was, along with 1 Cathedral Street at its rear, formerly St George's Hospital. The building is so named because it has a weaver's measure (or ell) attached to its exterior.

Plaque

See also
 List of listed buildings in Dunkeld And Dowally, Perth and Kinross

References

Listed buildings in Dunkeld
Category B listed buildings in Perth and Kinross
1757 establishments in Scotland